Yūki Meguro is a Japanese actor. He is the son of jidaigeki actor Jūshirō Konoe and had an older brother Hiroki Matsukata.  He was nominated for Outstanding Supporting Actor in a Limited Series for his work in Shōgun in 1981's Emmy award.

Filmography

Film
 Karei-naru Ichizoku (1974) as Ginpei Manpyo
Lupin III: Strange Psychokinetic Strategy (1974) as Arsène Lupin III
Legend of the Eight Samurai (1983)
Orochi, the Eight-Headed Dragon (1994)
Musashi (2019)

Television
Kunitori Monogatari (1973) as Maeda Toshiie
The Yagyu Conspiracy (1978) as Samon Tomonori Yagyū
Akō Rōshi (1979) as Uesugi Noritsuna
Shōgun  (1980) as Omi
Papa wa Newscaster (1987) as Hyuga
Hissatsu Shigotonin Gekitotsu (1991) as Narikawa
Come Come Everybody (2022) as Old Isamu Kijima

References

External links
 NHK 人物録　目黒祐樹

1947 births
Japanese male film actors
Japanese male child actors
Japanese male television actors
20th-century Japanese male actors
Japanese male stage actors
Living people